Jessica Raimondi (born 21 February 1999) is an Italian professional racing cyclist, who last rode for UCI Women's Team  in the 2019 women's road cycling season.

References

External links

1999 births
Living people
Italian female cyclists
Place of birth missing (living people)